Inside Information is a 1934 American film directed by Robert F. Hill.

Plot

Cast 
Rex Lease as Lloyd Wilson
Marion Shilling as Anne Seton
Tarzan as Tarzan, the police dog
Philo McCullough as Durand
Henry Hall as Mr. Seton
Charles King as "Blackie" Black
Jean Porter as Gertie
Robert McKenzie as Mack, Fat Detective
Victor Potel as Rice, Thin Detective
Robert F. Hill as Police Chief Gallagher
Henry Roquemore as Police Commissioner
Vance Carroll as Traffic Cop
Charles Harper as Henchman
Jimmy Aubrey as Henry, Durand's Houseboy
Baby Woods as Georgie, Toddler

References

External links 

1934 films
American black-and-white films
1934 adventure films
American adventure films
1930s English-language films
Films directed by Robert F. Hill
1930s American films
English-language adventure films